Tuukka Smura (born June 5, 1995) is a Finnish ice hockey goaltender. He made his Liiga debut during the 2013–14 Liiga season with KalPa, for whom he is currently playing.

References

External links

1995 births
Living people
Finnish ice hockey goaltenders
KalPa players
People from Kajaani
Sportspeople from Kainuu